Trull is a village, electoral ward and civil parish in Somerset, England, situated near Taunton.  The parish which includes Dipford has a population of 2,288.

History
The name Trull is thought to derive from the word Trendle meaning circle or wheel.

The parish of Trull was part of the Taunton Deane Hundred.

Governance
The parish council has responsibility for local issues, including setting an annual precept (local rate) to cover the council’s operating costs and producing annual accounts for public scrutiny. The parish council evaluates local planning applications and works with the local police, district council officers, and neighbourhood watch groups on matters of crime, security, and traffic. The parish council's role also includes initiating projects for the maintenance and repair of parish facilities, as well as consulting with the district council on the maintenance, repair, and improvement of highways, drainage, footpaths, public transport, and street cleaning. Conservation matters (including trees and listed buildings) and environmental issues are also the responsibility of the council.

The village falls within the non-metropolitan district of Somerset West and Taunton, which was established on 1 April 2019. It was previously in the district of Taunton Deane, which was formed on 1 April 1974 under the Local Government Act 1972, and part of Taunton Rural District before that. The district council is responsible for local planning and building control, local roads, council housing, environmental health, markets and fairs, refuse collection and recycling, cemeteries and crematoria, leisure services, parks, and tourism.

Somerset County Council is responsible for running the largest and most expensive local services such as education, social services, libraries, main roads, public transport, policing and  fire services, trading standards, waste disposal and strategic planning.

It is also part of the Taunton Deane county constituency represented in the House of Commons of the Parliament of the United Kingdom. It elects one Member of Parliament (MP) by the first past the post system of election.

Religious sites
All Saints Church has a tower dating from the 13th century; the rest is 15th-century. It was served by the monks of Taunton Priory until 1308. The east window, dating from the 15th century, depicts the crucifixion with St John and the Mother of Jesus at the foot of the Cross. The pulpit is believed to date from around 1500. The building has been designated by English Heritage as a Grade I listed building.

Dee's Book Exchange
As in several small villages around the UK, the telephone box has been refashioned into a book exchange. This was set up and scrupulously maintained by Dee Luke, long term resident/village shop keeper of Trull. The book exchange was renamed "Dee's Book Exchange" in 2022, in memory of Dee who died in 2021 by Trull Parish Council.

References

External links

Trull village website
All Saints church website
Trull Players Drama Group website

Villages in Taunton Deane
Civil parishes in Somerset